Bruno André Freitas Monteiro (born 5 October 1984) is a Portuguese footballer who plays for AD Fafe as a defensive midfielder or a central defender.

Club career
Monteiro was born in Fafe, Braga District. He played five years with AD Fafe in the Portuguese third division, moving to another northern club, Boavista FC, for the 2008–09 season, and suffering relegation from the Segunda Liga.

The following campaign, Monteiro made his Primeira Liga debut with Vitória de Setúbal. He appeared in only six competitive matches during the season, being subsequently loaned in summer 2010 to C.D. Santa Clara from division two.

Monteiro joined third-tier team F.C. Tirsense after leaving Setúbal, continuing to compete there the following years. He signed a one-year contract with C.D. Tondela in the 2014 off-season, contributing 39 games and one goal in his first year as the former reached the top flight for the first time ever.

Monteiro finished his second season at the Estádio João Cardoso with 24 appearances (17 starts), helping the club to narrowly avoid relegation. He scored his first goal in the Portuguese top division on 3 December 2016, but in a 3–1 away loss against Rio Ave FC.

In the following two top-tier campaigns, Monteiro played an average of 30 matches as Tondela managed to stay afloat. In January 2020, however, as he had been deemed surplus to requirements by new manager Natxo González, the 35-year-old terminated his contract and moved to Leixões S.C. on a one-and-a-half-year deal.

References

External links

1984 births
Living people
People from Fafe
Sportspeople from Braga District
Portuguese footballers
Association football defenders
Association football midfielders
Association football utility players
Primeira Liga players
Liga Portugal 2 players
Segunda Divisão players
Campeonato de Portugal (league) players
AD Fafe players
Boavista F.C. players
Vitória F.C. players
C.D. Santa Clara players
F.C. Tirsense players
S.C. Freamunde players
C.D. Tondela players
Leixões S.C. players
Amarante F.C. players